Snowdrops (species of Galanthus) are popular late winter or early spring flowers which are celebrated as a sign of spring and can attract large numbers of visitors to places where they are growing. The reason for their popularity is that snowdrops can form impressive carpets of white in areas where they are native or have been naturalised. Most 'Snowdrop Gardens' will have the common snowdrop, Galanthus nivalis, but some have more unusual snowdrops, some which may be unique to the garden that they are growing in. The rarest may only survive in that garden due to the conditions and environment.

Galanthophile
A galanthophile is a snowdrop enthusiast. They may be authors of snowdrop books, cultivate snowdrops, collect snowdrops and have displays of them for personal and public display. Well known galanthophiles are the horticulturalist E. A. Bowles and the nurseryman James Allen. Modern day galanthophiles range from teenagers to the elderly, who continue under the same principles but also visit many of the gardens each year to see the displays of snowdrops as part of their hobby.
The UK-based Cottage Garden Society has a snowdrop group that visits snowdrop gardens every year.

Notable events
There are a number of snowdrop gardens in England, Wales, Scotland, and Ireland. Sixty gardens took part in Scotland's first Snowdrop Festival (1 Feb–11 March 2007). Several gardens in England open during snowdrop season for the National Gardens Scheme (NGS) (see their website for up-to-date details).

England and Wales
Adlington Hall & Gardens, Cheshire
Anglesey Abbey, Lode, Cambridgeshire
Bank Hall, Bretherton, Lancashire
Benington Lordship, Hertfordshire
Brandy Mount, New Alresford, Hampshire (NCCPG National Plant Collection of Snowdrops) (NGS)
Chelsea Physic Garden, has over 120 varieties which bloom especially early due to the garden's warmth 
Chippenham Park, Newmarket, Cambridge, Cambridgeshire.
Colesbourne Park, Gloucestershire
East Lambrook Manor, Somerset (NGS)
Easton Lodge, near Little Easton, Essex
Easton Walled Gardens, near Grantham, Lincolnshire
Felley Priory, Nottinghamshire
 The Garden House, Dartmoor, Devon - over 350 varieties. Snowdrop festival every February.  http://www.thegardenhouse.org.uk
Goldsborough Hall, Goldsborough, near Knaresborough, North Yorkshire
Hanwell Community Observatory, Hanwell, Oxfordshire
Hopton Hall, Hopton, Derbyshire
Hodsock Priory, Nottinghamshire
Huccaby, St Raphael, Dartmoor, Devon
Ickworth House, Park and Gardens, Horringer, Bury St Edmunds, Suffolk
Kingston Lacy, Dorset
Moggerhanger House, Bedfordshire
Ness Botanic Gardens, Merseyside
Painswick Rococo Gardens, Gloucestershire
Rode Hall & Gardens, Cheshire
Rodmarton Manor, Gloucestershire
Walsingham, Norfolk
Welford Park, Newbury, Berkshire
Wye Valley Sculpture Garden, Tintern, Monmouthshire

Scotland
Lawton House, Arbroath, Angus
Cambo Estate, Fife
Danevale Park, Crossmichael, Dumfries
Finlaystone, Renfrewshire
Gagie House, Dundee

Ireland
Mark Smyth's Garden, Antrim
Primrose Hill, Lucan, County Dublin,
Altamont Garden, Tullow, County Carlow

Further reading
Aaron P. Davis, The Genus Galanthus, A Botanical Magazine Monograph. Timber Press, Portland, OR (in association with the Royal Botanic Gardens, Kew) 
Matt Bishop, Aaron Davis, John Grimshaw, Snowdrops - A Monograph of Cultivated Galanthus, Griffin Press, January 2002
Stern F C, Snowdrops and Snowflakes – A study of the Genera Galanthus and Leucojum, The Royal Horticultural Society, 1956

References

Snowdrop